Taurus KEPD 350 is a Swedish-German air-launched cruise missile, manufactured by Taurus Systems and used by Germany, Spain, and South Korea. Taurus Systems GmbH is a partnership between MBDA Deutschland GmbH (formerly LFK) and Saab Bofors Dynamics.

Overview
Taurus is powered by a turbofan engine at Mach 0.95 and can be carried by Tornado, Eurofighter Typhoon, Gripen, F/A-18, and F-15K jets.

The double  warhead, called Mephisto (Multi-Effect Penetrator HIghly Sophisticated and Target Optimised), features a precharge and initial penetrating charge to clear soil or enter HDBT (Hard and Deeply Buried Targets) hardened underground bunker, then a variable delay fuze to control detonation of the main warhead. Intended targets are hardened bunkers; command, control, and communications facilities; airfield and port facilities; AMS and ammunition storage; ships in port or at sea; area target attack and bridges.

The missile also includes counter measures as a self-defence mechanism and electronic counter measures. 

Mission planners program the missile with the target, air defence locations and planned ground path, then the missile uses a low terrain-hugging flight path guided by INS, IBN, TRN, and GPS to the proximity of the target, although it is capable of navigating over very long distances without GPS support. Once there the missile commences a bunt (climb) manoeuvre to an altitude intended to achieve the best probability of target acquisition and penetration. During the cruise flight a high resolution thermographic camera (infrared homing) can support the navigation by using IBN and is also used for GPS-free target attack. The missile attempts to match a camera image with the planned 3D target model (DSMAC). If it cannot, it defaults to the other navigation systems, or, if there is a high risk of collateral damage, it will steer to a pre-designated crash point instead of risking an inaccurate attack with undesired consequences.

Taurus Systems GmbH has also proposed an anti-ship variant.

Export
Spain's military bought 45 missiles.  The integration of the Taurus in the Spanish Air Force service line has been certified by the successful completion of a dedicated test campaign in South Africa, carried out in May 2009.

South Korea planned to order 200 missiles to integrate with their F-15K Slam Eagles after being refused Lockheed Martin's AGM-158 JASSM by Washington. The Defense Acquisition Program Administration (DAPA) signed the deal in November 2013.  Taurus Systems will open an office in Seoul to handle various acquisition tasks and support technology-transfer and joint development of the next cruise missile.  The office was the company's first outside of Germany, and the KEPD 350 is the first European missile to be integrated onto a South Korean fighter aircraft. In October 2016, South Korea announced it would acquire a further 90 Taurus missiles, in addition to the 170 previously ordered, in response to North Korean nuclear and missile provocations. On 12 December 2016, the first 40 Taurus KEPD 350K missiles were delivered to the ROKAF, which began deployment for combat use on 22 December 2016.

Variants

The Taurus KEPD 350K variant for the ROKAF differs from the baseline model by being equipped with a Rockwell Collins GPS receiver with a Selective Availability Anti-Spoofing Module (SAASM) to prevent jamming.

In October 2015, Taurus Systems revealed it was developing a smaller version of the Taurus missile, called the 350K-2, for use on light fighters, particularly the South Korean FA-50.

In December 2016, South Korea's Defense Acquisition Program Administration (DAPA) revealed it plans to start development on its own indigenous long-range air-to-ground missile in 2018, based on the Taurus cruise missile.  The weapon will be mounted on the KAI KF-21 Boramae fighter, to be developed by the mid-2020s.

Operators

Current operators
  600 ordered for the German Air Force's Panavia Tornados at a cost of €570 million. Deliveries ended in December 2010.
  43 ordered for the Spanish Air Force's F/A-18s. Deliveries ended in August 2010. The program cost €60m.
  170 in service with 90 ordered, for use on the Republic of Korea Air Force's F-15K fighter jets.

See also

 AGM-158 JASSM
 HOPE/HOSBO
 KD-88
 Ra'ad
 Ra'ad-II
 SOM (missile)
 Storm Shadow
 YJ-22
 CJ-10
 Brahmos
 Wan Chien
 Joint Strike Missile
 Fateh Mobin

Notes

References

Further reading
 .

External links

Cruise missiles
Cruise missiles of Germany
Post–Cold War weapons of Germany
Cruise missiles of Sweden
Military equipment introduced in the 2000s